Parliamentary elections were held in the Central African Republic on 15 March 1964. The country was a one-party state at the time, with the Movement for the Social Evolution of Black Africa (MESAN) as the sole legal party. As a result, it won all 60 seats in the National Assembly with 98.96% of the vote.

Results

References

Central African
Elections in the Central African Republic
1964 in the Central African Republic
One-party elections